KNWC may refer to:

 KNWC (AM), AM 1270 in Sioux Falls, South Dakota
 KNWC-FM, 96.5 FM in Sioux Falls, South Dakota